Louis-Claude Danré de Blanzy (1710-???) was a French royal notary, seigneurial judge and the son of Charles Danré de Blanzy, a lawyer in the parliament of Paris, and Suzanne Morillon.

See also
 André Souste

References 
 

1710 births
Year of death missing
French notaries
18th-century French judges